James David Gibson-Watt, Baron Gibson-Watt  (11 September 1918 – 7 February 2002) was a British Conservative Party politician.

Educated at Eton College and Trinity College, Cambridge, Gibson-Watt served in the Welsh Guards from 1939 to 1946, seeing action in the North African campaign and the Italian campaign. He was awarded the Military Cross in 1943, later gaining two bars. A farmer and forester, he served as a Radnor County Councillor and chairman of the Livestock Export Council.

He was an unsuccessful parliamentary candidate for the Brecon and Radnor constituency in 1950 and 1951, before being elected as Member of Parliament for Hereford in February 1956. He held this seat until September 1974, when he stood down. He held office as a Lord Commissioner of the Treasury from 1959 to 1961, as an opposition spokesman on communications and broadcasting from 1965 and as Minister of State at the Welsh Office from 1970 to 1974. He was appointed a Privy Counsellor in 1974.

Gibson-Watt later held public office as a Forestry Commissioner from 1976 to 1986, as Chairman of the Council on Tribunals, 1980–86, and as a Member of the Historic Buildings Council, Wales, 1975–79.  He was also Chairman of Timber Growers United Kingdom, 1987–90 (Honorary President, 1993–98), a Fellow of the Royal Agricultural Society, and President of the Royal Welsh Agricultural Society, 1976 (Chairman of the Council, 1976–94).
  
In 1979 he was created a life peer as Baron Gibson-Watt, of the Wye in the District of Radnor.

Gibson-Watt married Diana Hambro (b. 1922), daughter of Sir Charles Hambro, in 1942, and their second son David Julian Gibson-Watt married Patricia Hewitt, a member of the Labour Party, who after their subsequent divorce was elected as an MP.

References

External links 
 

1918 births
2002 deaths
Alumni of Trinity College, Cambridge
Conservative Party (UK) MPs for English constituencies
Conservative Party (UK) life peers
Councillors in Wales
Members of the Privy Council of the United Kingdom
Ministers in the Macmillan and Douglas-Home governments, 1957–1964
People educated at Eton College
Politics of Herefordshire
Recipients of the Military Cross
UK MPs 1955–1959
UK MPs 1959–1964
UK MPs 1964–1966
UK MPs 1966–1970
UK MPs 1970–1974
UK MPs 1974
Welsh Guards officers
British Army personnel of World War II
Life peers created by Elizabeth II